The Democratic Party or the Democratic Party in Timor-Leste is a political party in East Timor, established on 10 June, 2001. Currently, most of the members of the party are of the young generation who are studying abroad, and those who have completed their studies in Indonesia, Norway, Portugal, Australia, New Zealand and the United States.

Political history
In the 2001 parliamentary election held on 30 August, the party won 8.7% of the popular vote and seven out of 88 seats, the second-highest representation in parliament, after Fretilin.

In the April 2007 presidential election, the party's leader, Fernando de Araújo, took third place with 19.18% of the vote.

In provisional results of the June 2007 parliamentary election, the party won 11.30% of the vote, placing fourth.

Election results

Presidential elections

Legislative elections

External links
 Official website

References 

Political parties in East Timor